Kotlina is a settlement in the region of Baranja, Croatia. Administratively, it is located in the Kneževi Vinogradi municipality within the Osijek-Baranja County. The population is 334 people.

Ethnic groups (2001 census)
Hungarians = 295
Croats = 26
Serbs = 3
others = 10

See also
Osijek-Baranja county
Baranja

References 

Kneževi Vinogradi